Come Back, All is Forgiven is the sixth album by Australian band Custard, and their first new material in 16 years. It was released on 6 November 2015 through ABC Music on CD, vinyl, and digital. The album features the classic line-up of David McCormack, Glenn Thompson, Paul Medew and Matthew Strong. The songs were tracked at Horses Of Australia Studio on a weekend in February 2015. Overdubs were later added by David at Sonar Studio and Glenn at Horses Of Australia Studio. Glenn mixed it over the following couple of months.

The single "We Are The Parents (Our Parents Warned Us About)" was released to radio in September 2015.

Track listing

Charts

References

2015 albums
Custard (band) albums